Silene alpestris, the alpine catch-fly, is a species of flowering plant in the pink family Caryophyllaceae, native to Europe in the mountains of Italy, Austria, Slovenia and Croatia. It produces masses of tiny white flowers over a long period in Spring and Summer.

A double-flowered cultivar, 'Flore Pleno', has received the Royal Horticultural Society's Award of Garden Merit. 'Starry Dreams' is a more floriferous cultivar than the species. All forms are suitable subjects for an alpine garden or rock garden with good drainage. Alkaline or neutral soils are preferred.

Some authorities regard Silene alpestris as a synonym of Heliosperma alpestre.

See also
List of Silene species

References

alpestris
Alpine flora
Flora of Austria
Flora of Croatia
Flora of Italy
Flora of Slovenia